Sir Charles John Johnston (11 October 1845 – 13 June 1918) was a New Zealand merchant and politician. He was the Mayor of Wellington in 1890, the Jubilee year and was Speaker of the Legislative Council for the last three years of his life. He was a foundation director of the Wellington and Manawatu Railway Company.

Biography 
He was born on 11 October 1845 in Wellington, the son of merchant John Johnston. He was educated at Wellington Commercial and Grammar School, and was later educated in England at the Catholic College of St. Mary in Derbyshire, and at Kensington Grammar School in London. He returned to New Zealand in 1864 and entered Johnston & Co who were ship owners and merchants. His family was descended from the Johnstons of Annandale, through the Ayrshire Branch of the family. A brother Walter Woods Johnston was also an MP.

He joined the volunteers and when the Wellington Brigade was formed was appointed to the rank of captain. When he moved to the active-reserve he was appointed Captain-Commandant. Two of his eight sons were killed in action in World War I, Brigadier-General Francis Earl Johnston and Captain Octavius Featherston Johnston. Another four of his sons also served in World War I - Guy, Charles, Harold, and Ian Johnston. Johnston also had three daughters - Zoë, Alice, and Doris. Zoë was also widowed on the death of her husband William Fitzgerald Levin from injuries suffered at Gallipoli.

He represented the Te Aro electorate from 1881 to 1887, when he resigned. He was a member of the Legislative Council from 1891 until his death in 1918, and the Speaker from 1915 to 1918. He was appointed from 22 January 1891 as one of seven new members (including Harry Atkinson himself) appointed to the Council by the outgoing fourth Atkinson Ministry; a move regarded by Liberals as a stacking of the upper house against the new government.

His fourth son, Harold Featherston Johnston (1875–1959), became a judge of the Supreme Court and was appointed King's Counsel in 1930. Upon the death of Charles Skerrett in 1929, the position of Chief Justice was offered to Harold Johnston, who declined the offer, and Michael Myers became the next Chief Justice instead.

Johnston died in Wellington on 13 June 1918 after a prolonged illness. He was to be knighted in 1918, but he died before the patent could be completed.

Notes

References 

No Mean City by Stuart Perry (1969, Wellington City Council) includes a paragraph and a portrait or photo for each mayor.

1845 births
1918 deaths
Mayors of Wellington
Members of the New Zealand House of Representatives
Speakers of the New Zealand Legislative Council
Members of the New Zealand Legislative Council
New Zealand MPs for Wellington electorates
19th-century New Zealand politicians
Charles
Bell family